Stepnoy Dvorets is a rural locality (a selo) in Kabansky District, Republic of Buryatia, Russia. The population was 338 as of 2010. There are 6 streets.

Geography 
Stepnoy Dvorets is located 26 km northwest of Kabansk (the district's administrative centre) by road. Ranzhurovo is the nearest rural locality.

References 

Rural localities in Kabansky District